Senators for life in Italy are members of the Italian Senate who are either appointed, limited in number up to five, by the Italian President "for outstanding patriotic merits in the social, scientific, artistic or literary field" or are former presidents and thus senators for life ex officio.

Every president of the Italian Republic has made at least one appointment of a senator for life, with the exception of Oscar Luigi Scalfaro (since in his term there were more than five). President Giorgio Napolitano appointed Professor Mario Monti on 9 November 2011 and conductor Claudio Abbado, researcher Elena Cattaneo, architect Renzo Piano and Nobel-laureate physicist Carlo Rubbia on 30 August 2013. The president who appointed the highest number of senators for life was Luigi Einaudi, who made eight appointments during his term.

Senators for life are the only senators who can decide not to be part of any political group.

Limitations 

The Italian Constitution provides that the President of the Republic may appoint up to five senators for life. Until 2020 it  was debated whether five was intended to be the maximum overall number of senators for life, or if each President had the ability to appoint up to five senators regardless of how many had been appointed by their predecessor and were still living. Until 1984 the former interpretation enjoyed the support of a majority of scholars. In that year, however, President Sandro Pertini applied the latter interpretation. Pertini's successors applied varying standards. Oscar Luigi Scalfaro appointed none, in deference to the stricter reading, while both Carlo Azeglio Ciampi and Giorgio Napolitano appointed five each.

Eventually, the 2020 constitutional reform ended the debate by establishing unambiguously a limit of five overall appointed senators.

List of senators for life

Gallery of current senators for life

External links
Senato.it: Senatori a vita